Henrique II was ruler of the Kingdom of Kongo (1794 – 1803). His rule came after the end of a period of conflict in the kingdom after the death of Afonso V, who was said to have been poisoned. Henrique was able to take the throne as a compromise between the various powerful factions which had been brokered by the Água Rosada house, the descendants of Pedro IV, who had familial ties to branches of both Kinlaza and Kimpanzu houses. Under this peace, Henrique was able to rebuild the nation, and eventually passed the throne on to Garcia V, a member of the Água Rosada house.

References

Sources
 John K. Thorton, Mbanza Kongo/Sao Salvador :  Kongo's Holy City
 Africa's Urban Past, Oxford, James Currey (ed. David M. Andreson and Richard Rathbone), Portsmouth, Heinemann, 2000, pp. 73–78.

Manikongo of Kongo
1794 births
1800s deaths